Thomas Lancelot Lewis  (23 January 1922 – 25 April 2016) was a New South Wales politician, Premier of New South Wales and minister in the cabinets of Sir Robert Askin and Sir Eric Willis. He became Premier following Askin's retirement from politics and held the position until he was replaced by Willis in a party vote. Lewis was first elected to the New South Wales Legislative Assembly for the Electoral district of Wollondilly for the Liberal Party in 1957, and served until his resignation in 1978.

Early life
He was born in Adelaide, the son of Lancelot Ashley and Gretta Lewis, and was educated at St Peter's College, Adelaide, from 1931 to 1940. Subsequently, he managed the property of his uncle, Essington Lewis, Managing Director of BHP and Director-General of Munitions during World War II. He was a member of the Australian Imperial Force from 1940 to 1946, and served in Sydney, Celebes, Java and Borneo as a lieutenant. He was on the staff of the Embassy of Australia, Washington, D.C. from 1946 to 1951.

Early career
Lewis was elected as the member for Wollondilly representing the Liberal Party in 1957. When the Askin Government came to power in 1965, Lewis was given relatively junior portfolios of Lands and Mines. As lands minister he was responsible for setting up the NSW National Parks & Wildlife Service in 1967. In 1970, he set up the Foundation for National Parks & Wildlife as an independent not-for-profit organisation, in order to be the fundraising arm of the NSW National Parks & Wildlife Service. In 1972, Tourism was added to his ministerial responsibilities when Eric Willis moved to Education.

Premier
Askin announced his resignation late in 1974, and Lewis was chosen as leader over Willis and Justice Minister John Maddison. He was sworn in on as Premier on 3 January 1975. He was elected during an uneasy time for the Liberal government, being engaged in almost daily warfare with the Whitlam Labor Government in Canberra, most notably over the Medibank health care scheme, to which New South Wales was the last state to sign.

The defining moment of the Lewis government was the decision taken by Lewis to break with convention when Whitlam appointed his Attorney-General, Lionel Murphy, a Senator from New South Wales, to the High Court of Australia. In a break with long-standing convention, Lewis refused to appoint a replacement Senator from the same party, instead appointing the 72-year-old Mayor of Albury, Cleaver Bunton. This triggered immediate outrage, not only from the Labor Party but also the executive of the Liberal party.

By the end of 1975, Lewis' image was badly damaged and he soon lost the confidence of his party. Sentiment was growing in favour of replacing him with Sir Eric Willis. At a caucus meeting on 20 January 1976, parliamentary backbencher Neil Pickard called a spill motion, which was carried 22 votes to 11. Lewis opted not to try to regain his post, leaving Willis to take the leadership unopposed. Lewis's term as Premier came to an end on 23 January 1976, his 54th birthday. Lewis was the only non-elected non-Labor premier who did not take the Coalition into an election.

Later life
Lewis served as Willis' Minister for Local Government until May 1976, when the Liberal Government was narrowly defeated by the Labor Party. In opposition Lewis did not hold any position within the Shadow Cabinet and later resigned from Parliament on 7 September 1978, the vacancy becoming one of the justifications for calling the election for 7 October 1978. At the election, his seat fell to the Labor candidate Bill Knott. On his departure from parliament, he was permitted by Queen Elizabeth II, on the Governor's recommendation, to continue to use the title "The Honourable".

He was made an Officer of the Order of Australia on 26 January 2000 "For service to the Parliament of New South Wales, to the environment as the founder of the NSW National Parks & Wildlife Service, and to the community". On 1 January 2001 he was awarded the Centenary Medal. Lewis died on 25 April 2016, aged 94.

References

 

1922 births
2016 deaths
People educated at St Peter's College, Adelaide
Australian Army officers
Australian Army personnel of World War II
Members of the New South Wales Legislative Assembly
Premiers of New South Wales
1975 Australian constitutional crisis
Liberal Party of Australia members of the Parliament of New South Wales
Treasurers of New South Wales
Officers of the Order of Australia
Recipients of the Centenary Medal